Dirhinosia is a genus of moths in the family Gelechiidae.

Species
 Dirhinosia arnoldiella (Rebel, 1905)
 Dirhinosia cervinella (Eversmann, 1844)
 Dirhinosia nitidula (Stainton, 1867)
 Dirhinosia unifasciella (Rebel, 1929)

References

 , 2004, Acta Zoologica Academiae Scientiarum Hungaricae 50 (1): 63-74. 

 
Anomologini